San (Bambara: ߛߊߣ tr. San) is an urban commune, town and capital of the Cercle of San in the Ségou Region of Mali. The town lies 10 km south of the Bani River. In the 2009 census the commune had a population of 68,078.

San is the center of bògòlanfini production, a traditional Malian fabric.

Former President of Mali Bah Ndaw was born here on 23 August 1950.

Climate

Twin towns
San is twinned with:

  Chaumont, Haute-Marne, France, since 1995

References

External links
. Gives the history of the town.

 
Communes of Ségou Region